Kamas is a city in southwestern Summit County, Utah, United States. It is part of the Salt Lake City, Utah Metropolitan Statistical Area. The population was 1,811 at the 2010 census.

The main industries are cattle ranching and lumber. Fishing, camping, hiking, mountain climbing and other outdoor recreational activities are popular among locals. Kamas is the closest city to the Camp Steiner Boy Scout camp.

History

Kamas derives its name from Camassia quamash, a source of food for Native Americans.

Kamas was inhabited intermittently by several Native American ethnic groups, including members of the Ute, Shoshone, and Snake tribes. The first permanent settlements in the valley are believed to have been built by Mormon pioneers including Abraham Marchant, John Lambert, and John Pack who settled under the direction of Brigham Young.

One prominent figure in Kamas folklore history is Thomas Rhoads. According to legend, Indian guides from an area Ute Tribe revealed to Rhoads the location of a gold mine from which he was allowed to take gold to assist in the construction of the Salt Lake Temple. The only condition the Ute guides gave for revealing the location of this mine was that Rhoads agreed not to reveal the location of the mine to any other person. Rhoads adhered to the terms of this agreement until his eventual death from an illness. The "Rhoads Mine" is now considered lost, but its legend survives in several books which have been published on the topic.

Geography

Climate

According to the Köppen Climate Classification system, Kamas has a warm-summer humid continental climate, abbreviated "Dfb" on climate maps.

Demographics
As of the census of 2000, there were 1,274 people, 445 households, and 327 families residing in the city. The population density was  people per square mile  (/km2). There were 482 housing units at an average density of 303.4 per square mile  (/km2). The racial makeup of the city was 96.31% White, 0.39% African American, 0.16% Native American, 0.31% Asian, 0.08% Pacific Islander, 2.04% from other races, and 0.71% from two or more races. Hispanic or Latino of any race were 5.89% of the population.

There were 445 households, out of which 41.8% had children under the age of 18 living with them, 58.2% were married couples living together, 11.5% had a female householder with no husband present, and 26.5% were non-families. 21.1% of all households were made up of individuals, and 8.3% had someone living alone who was 65 years of age or older. The average household size was 2.86 and the average family size was 3.37.

In the city, the population was spread out, with 33.0% under the age of 18, 9.6% from 18 to 24, 29.9% from 25 to 44, 18.4% from 45 to 64, and 9.1% who were 65 years of age or older. The median age was 30 years. For every 100 females, there were 99.1 males. For every 100 females age 18 and over, there were 95.0 males.

The median income for a household in the city was $41,667, and the median income for a family was $46,750. Males had a median income of $30,703 versus $22,434 for females. The per capita income for the city was $16,761. About 3.6% of families and 7.3% of the population were below the poverty line, including 7.1% of those under age 18 and 4.5% of those age 65 or over.

Education
It is in the South Summit School District. The town is home to the South Summit school district's facilities, and has one high school, one middle school, and an elementary school (all called South Summit). Nearby towns Peoa, Oakley, Marion, Francis and Woodland all send students to these schools. Students in nearby Weber Canyon and Mirror Lake Canyon also reside in the school district boundaries.

Religion
The predominant religion of the area, as with most rural towns of Utah, is the Church of Jesus Christ of Latter-day Saints, although Kamas Bible Church is also located in Kamas. There is also a small Catholic minority, many of whom attend church either in Heber City or Park City.

Events
Kamas is the starting point for the annual High Uintas Classic, a two-day bicycle race that takes place every summer, usually in mid-June. The race features a mountain stage that takes participants on the Mirror Lake Highway from downtown Kamas over Bald Mountain Pass and into Evanston, Wyoming. Part of the route for the final two stages of the 2012 Tour of Utah cycling race went through downtown Kamas. The Tour of Utah returned in 2013 and cyclists went through Kamas again during the sixth and final stage.

Kamas also hosts Fiesta Days, a community celebration on and around July 4 and the 24, the Pioneer Day holiday in Utah.  Fiesta Days includes rodeos, a demolition derby, a parade, and the Miss Fiesta Days beauty/scholarship pageant. Also, the city hosts the High Country Classic wrestling tournament every January.

See also

 List of cities and towns in Utah
 High Uintas Wilderness

References

External links

 
 Kamas Historical Society
 History of Kamas

Cities in Utah
Cities in Summit County, Utah
Salt Lake City metropolitan area
Populated places established in 1859
1859 establishments in Utah Territory